The 2016 Ligue de Football de Saint Pierre et Miquelon was the 31st season of top-division football in Saint Pierre and Miquelon. Three clubs competed in the league: AS Saint Pierraise, A.S. Miquelonnaise and A.S. Ilienne Amateur. The three teams played each other eight times, composing of a 16-match season starting on 28 May 2016 and ending on 10 September 2016.

Saint Pierraise won the league title, amassing the best record after 16 matches.

Clubs

Standings

References 

Ligue de Football de Saint Pierre et Miquelon seasons
Saint Pierre and Miquelon
Prem